This is a list of Nigerian films released in 2022.

2022

January–March

April–June

July–September 

{| class="wikitable"
! colspan="2" |Opening
! style="width:20%;" |Title
! style="width:10%;" |Director
!Cast
! style="width:13%" |Genre
! style="width:20%" |Notes
!Ref.
|-
| rowspan="2" style="text-align:center; background:orange; textcolor:#000;" |JULY
|style="text-align:center; background:#d8d8d8; textcolor:#000;" |22
|Tiger's Tail
||Uyoyou Adia

|Alexx EkuboNatacha AkideAkintoba Adeoluwa
Zubby Michael
|
|
|
|-
|style="text-align:center; background:#d8d8d8; textcolor:#000;" |29
|Hey You
|Uyoyou Adia
|Timini EgbusonEfe Irele
Rotimi Salami

Stan Nze

Tope Olowoniyan
|Romantic comedy
|Produced by Niyi Akinmolayan and Victoria Akujobi
|
|-
| rowspan="2" style="text-align:center; background:green; textcolor:#000;" |AUGUST
| rowspan="1" style="text-align:center; background:#d8d8d8; textcolor:#000;" |5
|Sista
|Biodun Stephen
|Kehinde Bankole
Bisola Aiyeola

Deyemi Okanlawon
|
|
|
|-
|style="text-align:center; background:#d8d8d8; textcolor:#000;"|
|The Set Up 2
|Naz Onuzo
|Adesua EtomiNancy Isime
Kehinde Bankole
|
|
|
|-
| rowspan="2" style="text-align:center; background:orange; textcolor:#000;" |SEPT
E

M

B

ER
| rowspan="2" style="text-align:center; background:#d8d8d8; textcolor:#000;" |
|
|
|
|
|
|
|-
|Anikulapo
|Kunle Afolayan
|
|
|
|
|}

October–December

See also 
 2022 in Nigeria
 List of Nigerian films

References

External links 

2022
Lists of 2022 films by country or language
Films
2020s in Nigerian cinema